Jeroen Mooren (born 30 July 1985, Nijmegen) is a former Dutch judoka who competed in the men's 60 kg category. At the 2012 Summer Olympics, he was defeated in the second round.

References

External links
 
 

1985 births
Living people
Dutch male judoka
European Games competitors for the Netherlands
Judoka at the 2012 Summer Olympics
Judoka at the 2016 Summer Olympics
Judoka at the 2015 European Games
Olympic judoka of the Netherlands
Sportspeople from Nijmegen
Universiade medalists in judo
Universiade gold medalists for the Netherlands
Medalists at the 2009 Summer Universiade
21st-century Dutch people